Princess Kagami (鏡王女 Kagami-no-ōkimi) was a Japanese princess and waka poet of the Asuka period.

Biography 
It is unknown when the poet known as Princess Kagami was born.

's Man'yōshū Kogi (万葉集古義) speculates that she was the elder sister of Princess Nukata. She exchanged sōmonka with Fujiwara no Kamatari, and the Kōfukuji Engi (興福寺縁起) records that she was his wife.

She died in 683.

Poetry 
Poems 92, 93, 489, 1419, and 1607 in the Man'yōshū are attributed to her.

References

Citations

Works cited 

 
 
 
 
 
 

7th-century Japanese poets
Man'yō poets
Japanese women poets
Japanese princesses